Joe Pacheco (born February 19, 1985) is an American mixed martial artist of Puerto Rican and Belizean descent who competes in Bellator's middleweight division.

Mixed martial arts career

Early career
Pacheco started his professional career in 2012. He fought only for American southeastern and Pennsylvania-based promotions.

In 2013, Pacheco signed with Bellator.

Bellator MMA
Pacheco made his debut against Kyle Bolt on February 14, 2013, at Bellator 89. He won via knockout in the second round.

Pacheco was expected to face Luc Bondole on March 21, 2013, at Bellator 93. However, Bondole was replaced by Pierry Pierre due to undisclosed reasons. Pacheco won via submission due to a keylock early in the first round.

Pacheco was expected to face Tyson Jeffries on September 27, 2013, at Bellator 101. However, Pacheco was called to replace an injured Perry Filkins against Brennan Ward in Bellator season nine middleweight tournament on October 4, 2013, at Bellator 102. Pacheco had his first professional career's defeat via submission due to a guillotine choke in the second round.

In March 2014, Pacheco entered into the Bellator Season 10 Middleweight tournament when Dan Cramer versus Jeremy Kimball was cancelled. He faced Brandon Halsey at Bellator 116 on April 11, 2014.  He lost the fight via unanimous decision.

Pacheco faced Keith Berry on October 3, 2014, at Bellator 127. He initially lost the fight via split decision. However, Berry failed his post-fight drug test and the California commission changed the result to a No Contest.

Championships and accomplishments

Amateur wrestling
North Carolina High School Athletic Association
North Carolina state wrestling 189 lb tournament: Champion  (2002, 2003)

Mixed martial arts record

|-
|NC
|align=center|7–2 (1)
|Keith Berry
|No Contest
|Bellator 127
|
|align=center|3
|align=center|5:00
|Temecula, California, United States
|Originally a split decision win for Berry; overturned after failing a drug test.
|-
|Loss
|align=center|7–2
| Brandon Halsey
| Decision (unanimous)
| Bellator 116
| 
| align=center|3
| align=center|5:00 
| Temecula, California, United States
| 
|-
|Loss
|align=center|7–1
|Brennan Ward
|Submission (guillotine choke)
|Bellator 102
|
|align=center|2
|align=center|2:41
|Visalia, California, United States
|
|-
|Win
|align=center|7–0
|Amaechi Oselukwue
|Decision (unanimous)
|Fight Lab 32
|
|align=center|3
|align=center|5:00
|Charlotte, North Carolina, United States
|
|-
|Win
|align=center|6–0
|Pierry Pierre
|Submission (keylock)
|Bellator 93
|
|align=center|1
|align=center|1:54
|Lewiston, Maine, United States
|
|-
|Win
|align=center|5–0
|Kyle Bolt
|KO (elbows)
|Bellator 89
|
|align=center|2
|align=center|4:02
|Charlotte, North Carolina, United States
|
|-
|Win
|align=center|4–0
|Nathan Gaylord
|Decision (unanimous)
|Wild Bill's Fight Night 51
|
|align=center|3
|align=center|5:00
|Duluth, Georgia, United States
|
|-
|Win
|align=center|3–0
|Jason Heflin
|Submission (armbar)
|Xtreme Caged Combat: Backlash
|
|align=center|2
|align=center|4:12
|Philadelphia, Pennsylvania, United States
|
|-
|Win
|align=center|2–0
|Darnell Hayes
|Submission (rear-naked choke)
|Central Pennsylvania Warrior Challenge 20
|
|align=center|1
|align=center|3:30
|Millersville, Pennsylvania, United States
|
|-
|Win
|align=center|1–0
|Lindsay Rowse
|Submission (armbar)
|Wild Bill's Fight Night 48
|
|align=center|1
|align=center|3:57
|Duluth, Georgia, United States
|

Mixed martial arts amateur record

|-
|Loss
|align=center|1–1
|Ferdinando Acerra
|Submission (guillotine choke)
|Fight Lab 22
|
|align=center|2
|align=center|1:26
|Sumter, South Carolina, United States
|
|-
|Win
|align=center|1–0
|Tony Scarlett
|Submission (punches)
|Fight Lab 16: MMA Cage Fights
|
|align=center|1
|align=center|1:59
|Charlotte, North Carolina, United States
|

References

1985 births
Living people
American male mixed martial artists
Mixed martial artists from New York (state)
Middleweight mixed martial artists
Mixed martial artists utilizing wrestling
American male sport wrestlers
Amateur wrestlers
Sportspeople from Queens, New York
American people of Belizean descent
American sportspeople of Puerto Rican descent